Filimonov (Russian: Филимонов) can refer to:

Filimonov: a Russian surname
Filimonov toy: a ceramic craft from the Tula region of Russian